Harry Leonard may refer to:

 Harry Ward Leonard (1861–1915), electrical engineer and inventor
 Harry Leonard (footballer) (1886–1951), English footballer
 Harry Leonard (rugby union) (born 1992), Scottish rugby union player
 Harry M. Leonard (1900–1985), American sound mixer
 Harold Leonard (conductor), conductor of the Waldorf–Astoria Orchestra

See also
 Henry Leonard (disambiguation)